Kim Jeong-seok (born January 3, 1994) is a South Korean football player.

Playing career
Kim Jeong-seok played for Sanfrecce Hiroshima, Roasso Kumamoto, Renofa Yamaguchi FC and FC Kariya from 2013 to 2015.

References

External links

1994 births
Living people
South Korean footballers
J1 League players
J2 League players
J3 League players
Sanfrecce Hiroshima players
Roasso Kumamoto players
Renofa Yamaguchi FC players
FC Kariya players
Association football midfielders